At the 1912 Summer Olympics in Stockholm, Sweden eight tennis events were contested divided over two tournaments; an indoor covered courts tournament, played on wood, held from May 5 until May 12 and an outdoor hard court tournament, played on clay, held from June 28 until July 5.

Tennis on covered courts was agreed initially for the 1912 Games, with competitions run for gentlemen's singles and doubles, ladies' singles and mixed doubles. The outdoor tournament was confirmed once the Östermalm Athletic Grounds were completed in late 1911, with the plans modified to have both indoor and outdoor tournaments.

Six countries sent players for the covered court competitions, with representatives from Sweden, Great Britain, Denmark, France, Australasia and Bohemia appearing. Included in this lineup was Australasia's only competitor, the New Zealander Anthony Wilding, who was also the reigning Wimbledon gentlemen's champion. The indoor knockout competition started on 5 May, and continued as expected until the semi final round where Wilding was beaten by Britain's Charles P. Dixon. The British player met Frenchman André Gobert in the final, but Gobert was victorious over the Englishman in straight sets. Wilding took the bronze medal in a playoff against another British player, Arthur Lowe.

The outdoors tennis competition saw seventy players enter from twelve nations. However, Great Britain did not enter any competitors as the dates of the outdoor competition clashed with the 1912 Wimbledon Championships despite attempts by the British authorities to convince the Olympic organizing committee to change the dates. Other noted tennis players including Anthony Wilding, André Gobert and Arthur Gore refused to compete at the Olympics and instead attended Wimbledon. The gold and silver medals in the gentlemen's singles ended up being decided between two South Africans, with Charles Winslow and Harold Kitson playing each other. Winslow won the match and the gold medal, 7–5, 4–6, 10–8, 8–6. The duo also competed as a pair in the gentlemen's doubles and took the gold medal, beating the Austrians Felix Pipes and Arthur Zborzil. Marguerite Broquedis of France defeated Dorothea Koring of Germany in the ladies' singles for the gold medal. In the mixed double Koring teamed up with Heinrich Schomburgk to win the gold, the duo defeating Sigrid Fick and Gunnar Setterwall of Sweden in the final.

Medal summary

Events

Outdoor

Indoor

Medal table

Participating nations 

A total of 82 tennis players (69 men and 13 women) from 14 nations (men from 14 nations - women from 6 nations) competed at the Stockholm Games:

  (men:1 women:0)
  (men:3 women:0)
  (men:8 women:0)
  (men:9 women:1)
  (men:5 women:1)
  (men:6 women:1)
  (men:8 women:3)
  (men:6 women:0)
  (men:1 women:0)
  (men:6 women:1)
  (men:2 women:0)
  (men:3 women:0)
  (men:10 women:6)
  (men:1 women:0)

References

External links
 International Olympic Committee medal database

 
1912 Summer Olympics events
1912
Olympics
1912 Olympics